SimTunes is a children's software toy designed by Toshio Iwai and released by Maxis in 1996. It involves painting a picture using large pixels, where each color represents a musical note. The player places up to four different-colored Bugz, which represent musical instruments or vocal syllables, on this picture, and can change their starting directions and relative speeds. The Bugz crawl over the picture, playing notes corresponding with the colors; and they turn, move randomly, or jump in response to function symbols that can be added to the dots.

SimTunes was originally developed in the early 1990s by Iwai as a game titled Sound Fantasy for the Super NES/Super Famicom. Many of the ideas and elements in Sound Fantasy are present in SimTunes.

References

External links

1996 video games
Music video games
Maxis Sim games
Non-games
Video games about insects
Video games developed in Japan
Video games scored by Jerry Martin
Windows games
Windows-only games
Software for children
Single-player video games